Rohit Mehra (born 27 December 1978) is an Indian former cricketer. He played two first-class matches for Delhi between 1998 and 2000.
Wife : Kanika Mehra

See also
 List of Delhi cricketers

References

External links
 

1978 births
Living people
Indian cricketers
Delhi cricketers
Cricketers from Delhi